Rocky is a nickname of the following people:
 Raquel Welch (born Jo Raquel Tejada; September 5, 1940), American actress and singer. 
 Rocky Agusta (1950–2018), Italian race car driver
 Rocky Anderson (born 1951), former mayor of Salt Lake City, Utah
 Hiroaki Aoki (1938–2008), Japanese-born American restaurateur
 Rocky Belk (1960–2010), American football player
 Rocky Bleier (born 1946), former American football player
 Rocky Bridges (1927–2015), former Major League Baseball player and minor league manager
 Rocky Colavito (born 1933), former Major League Baseball player
 Veronica Cooper (1913–2000), American actress
 Roy L. Dennis (1961–1978), American boy afflicted with an extremely rare bone disorder whose life was portrayed in the film Mask
 Ford Garrison (1915–2001), Major League Baseball player and coach
 Rocky George (born 1965), former guitar player of Suicidal Tendencies
 Rocky Gray (born 1974), drummer of the band Evanescence
 Rocky Graziano (1919–1990), American boxer
 Bob Johnson (infielder) (1936–2019), former Major League Baseball player
 Rocky Johnson (1944–2020), Canadian professional wrestler
 Rocky Juarez (born 1980), Mexican-American boxer
 Rocky Lockridge (1959–2019), former professional boxer 
 Rocky Marciano (1923–1969), American world heavyweight boxing champion
 Rocky Nelson (1924–2006), Major League Baseball player
 Bobby Rhawn (1919–1984), Major League Baseball player
 David Rocastle (1967–2001), English footballer
 Mike Rockenfeller (born 1983), German race car driver
 Nelson Rockefeller (1908–1979), American businessman, philanthropist, public servant and politician, former Vice President of the United States and Governor of New York
 Graciano Rocchigiani (1963–2018), German boxer 
 Rocky Sekorski (born 1957), American heavyweight boxer
 Rocky Thompson (golfer) (born 1939), American golfer
 Rocky Wirtz (born 1952), principal owner and chairman of the National Hockey League's Chicago Blackhawks
 Saimoni Rokini (born 1972), Fijian rugby union footballer
 John Stone (baseball) (1905–1955), Major League Baseball player
 Derek Turner (1932–2015), English former rugby player
 Humbert Roque Versace (1937–1965), US Army officer awarded the Medal of Honor
 Frank C. Whitmore (1887–1947), American chemist

See also
 Rock (name), which includes a short list of people nicknamed "Rock"
 Stoney (name), which includes people with the nickname

Lists of people by nickname